Qaleh Abdol Robababad (also Romanized as Qal‘eh ʿAbdol Robābābād) is a village in Zeynabad Rural District, Shal District, Buin Zahra County, Qazvin Province, Iran. At the 2006 census, its population was 58, in 17 families.

References 

Populated places in Buin Zahra County